The 2006–07 Ranji Trophy was the 73rd season of the Ranji Trophy. Mumbai defeated Bengal by 132 runs in the final.

Scorecards and averages
Cricketarchive

Group Matches

Super League
Group A

  Baroda and Karnataka qualified for the knockout stage.

Group B

  Bengal and Mumbai qualified for the knockout stage.

Knockout Matches

Semifinal 1

Semifinal 2

Final

References

External links

2007 in Indian cricket
Ranji Trophy seasons
Domestic cricket competitions in 2006–07